Chen Ping (陈平, died November 179 BC) was a Chinese politician who served as a chancellor in the early Western Han dynasty. He was an advisor to Liu Bang (Emperor Gao), the founding emperor of the Han dynasty. He played an important role in helping Liu Bang overcome his rival, Xiang Yu, in the Chu–Han Contention (206–202 BC).

Early life
Chen Ping was from Huyou Town, Yangwu (陽武 present-day Lankao County, Henan). He was born in a peasant family, and his parents died when he was still young so he lived with his elder brother. His elder brother worked as a farmer on the 30 mu of land that their family owned while Chen Ping spent his time reading. As a child, Chen Ping had an ambition to serve his country. Chen Ping remained single for a long time, until he met Zhang Fu, a wealthy man. Zhang Fu had a granddaughter who married five times, but all her husbands died not long after they married her, so other men did not want to marry her. One day, Zhang Fu followed Chen Ping to his residence and saw that although Chen's house was quite rundown, there were many carriages outside his house (which implied that Chen Ping was popular in town as many people visited him). Zhang Fu was so pleased that when he returned home he discussed with his son about marrying his granddaughter to Chen Ping. Zhang Fu's son was reluctant to marry his daughter to Chen Ping because he felt that Chen was too poor, but Zhang Fu claimed that Chen Ping had good relations with people. Chen Ping eventually married Zhang Fu's granddaughter and gradually became more affluent with support from his wife. 

Not long later, the townsfolk nominated Chen Ping to be their shezai (社宰 a local leader). Chen Ping distributed meat equally to his fellow townsfolk, and they praised him for being just and fair. Chen Ping once said, "If I can manage the world, I'll manage it in the same manner as I distribute meat, so that all people in the world will not need to be poor and hungry."

Participation in the rebellion against the Qin dynasty
In 209 BC, during the reign of Qin Er Shi, rebellions erupted throughout China to overthrow the Qin dynasty. Chen Ping pledged his service to Xiang Yu, a prominent rebel leader. After the fall of the Qin dynasty in late 207 BC, Xiang Yu marched his army into the Qin capital Xianyang and plundered and pillaged the city. Around this time, Chen Ping defected from Xiang Yu's side to Liu Bang, another prominent rebel leader. Liu Bang appointed Chen Ping as "Lieutenant Who Protects the Nation".

Chu–Han Contention and service under Liu Bang and Empress Lü
During the Chu–Han Contention, a power struggle for supremacy over China between Liu Bang and Xiang Yu, Chen Ping served Liu Bang as an advisor and helped to conceive strategies to help Liu overcome his rivals and unify China under his control. Liu Bang founded the Han dynasty and became historically known as "Emperor Gaozu of Han". Chen Ping was conferred the title "Marquis of Huyou" in recognition of his contributions, and he later received another title, "Marquis of Quni". He was appointed as Left Chancellor and Right Chancellor respectively during the reigns of Emperor Hui and when Empress Dowager Lü Zhi was in power.

Service under Emperor Wen
After Empress Lü's death in August 180 BCE, Chen Ping and Zhou Bo cooperated to put an end to the Lü Clan Disturbance and restore the Liu clan to power and install Liu Heng on the throne as Emperor Wen. On 16 December 180 BCE, Chen Ping was made Left Imperial Chancellor, while Zhou Bo was made Right Imperial Chancellor. This arrangement was due to Chen Ping petitioning that Zhou Bo's contributions were greater than his, and so he wanted to give up the position of Right Chancellor to Zhou Bo. 

Later that year, Emperor Wen once asked Zhou Bo, "How many cases do the courts see in a year?" Zhou Bo was unable to give an answer. Emperor Wen then asked again, "What is the net amount of money and grain the national treasury takes in in a year?" Zhou Bo could not answer the question. Chen Ping, who was serving as the Left Chancellor then, replied to the emperor's queries, "The answers lie with the respective persons in charge. For the number of cases, Your Majesty should ask the Minister of Justice. For the net amount of money and grain, Your Majesty should ask the Accountant of Revenue." Chen Ping also added that he felt that as a chancellor, he should not be in charge of everything, and that the chancellor's role was to assist the emperor by "pacifying all those outside the empire, maintaining peace within the empire and ensuring that all office holders perform their roles well." Zhou Bo was ashamed and felt that he was not as competent as Chen Ping, so he claimed that he was ill and resigned from his post on 2 October 179 BC, leaving Chen Ping solely in charge of both the Left and Right Chancellors' duties.

Death
Chen Ping died of illness in Chang'an in November 179 BC and was posthumously granted the title "Marquis Xian". He was buried at Chenyan Slope, Kushang Village, Huyou Town. His tomb and a shrine built for him existed until they were destroyed in a Yellow River flood during the Ming dynasty. Chen Ping's son, Chen Mai, inherited his father's marquis title after the latter's death. During the reign of Emperor Wu, Chen Ping's great-grandson, Chen He, was executed for committing a crime and his family were stripped of the titles they inherited from their ancestor.

Chen Ping's six strategies
Throughout his service under Liu Bang, there are six well known strategies that Chen Ping came up with to help his lord in overcoming his rivals and pacifying the empire.

The six strategies were:

 Sowing discord between Xiang Yu and his advisor Fan Zeng. Fan Zeng was angered and he left Xiang Yu. He died of illness on the journey home. (See Chu–Han Contention#Battle of Chenggao) The loss of Fan Zeng was one of the factors that contributed to Xiang Yu's defeat.
 Helping Liu Bang escape from danger during the Battle of Xingyang by diverting the enemy's attention away through disguise.
 Advising Liu Bang to grant Han Xin the title of a vassal king and a fief. Han Xin's loyalty to Liu Bang was strengthened, and Han Xin did his best to help Liu Bang overcome his rivals and claim the throne.
 Advising Liu Bang to form an alliance with the Qi kingdom against Xiang Yu.
 When Liu Bang heard rumours that Han Xin was plotting against him and harbouring a fugitive Zhongli Mo (one of Xiang Yu's generals), Chen Ping suggested to lure Han Xin into a trap and capture him. Han Xin fell for the ruse and was taken captive when he came to meet Liu Bang. Liu Bang pardoned Han Xin later but still demoted him from a vassal king to a marquis.
 Suggesting to Liu Bang to bribe Modu Chanyu's wife with gifts and ask her to request for her husband to lift the siege during the Battle of Baideng.

References

 Sima Qian. Records of the Grand Historian, Volume 56, House of Chancellor Chen.
 Ban Gu et al. Book of Han, Volume 40, Biography of Chen Ping.

178 BC deaths
Chu–Han contention people
Han dynasty politicians from Henan
Han dynasty prime ministers
Politicians from Kaifeng
Year of birth unknown